The 3rd National Geographic Bee was held in Washington, D.C. on May 23, 1991, sponsored by the National Geographic Society. The final competition was moderated by Jeopardy! host Alex Trebek. The winner was David Stillman of Craigmont, Idaho, who won a $25,000 college scholarship. The 2nd-place winner, Carlos De La Fuente of Chandler, Arizona, won a $15,000 scholarship. The 3rd-place winner, Eliot Brenner of Richmond, Virginia, won a $10,000 scholarship.

References

External links
 National Geographic Bee Official Website

National Geographic Bee